Los Bellotos del Melado National Reserve is a national reserve of Chile.

References

National reserves of Chile
Protected areas of Maule Region